Francisco José Requejo Rodríguez (born 17 April 1972) is a Spanish politician and businessman. Francisco Requejo is a member of the Citizens and is the highest provincial leader of Zamora, as president of the Zamora Provincial Council.

References 

1972 births
Living people
21st-century Spanish politicians 
Citizens (Spanish political party) politicians